José Luis Perotti Ronzoni (June 8, 1898 – June 22, 1956) was a Chilean sculptor. He won the National Prize of Art of Chile in 1953.

References

1898 births
1956 deaths
People from Santiago
Chilean sculptors
Male sculptors
Chilean male artists